Lewis Williamson (born 11 November 1989) is a British racing driver.

Career

Karting
Born in Dundee, Williamson began karting at the age of eight, and spent a successful decade racing in the various classes around the United Kingdom. By the time Williamson moved into the junior formulae in 2008, he had claimed three Scottish karting championship titles at Cadet and MiniMax levels, before taking a clean sweep in 2008. The first driver to record such a feat, Williamson won the British Open, British Grand Prix Super Kart, the Scottish Open, as well as the 125 ICC Championship.

Formula Renault
After a guest drive in Formula Jedi at Brands Hatch in which he won one of the two races, Williamson moved up into Formula Renault, contesting the 2008 Formula Renault UK Winter Series after Highland Arena Ltd, an organisation set up by three family friends helping to promote sporting talent from the Scottish Highlands – where Williamson resides – leased a car from CR Scuderia. In his second race in the category at Croft, Williamson finished on the podium, taking a third-place finish behind James Calado and Henry Surtees. He added another third place in the final race at Rockingham Motor Speedway, finishing behind Surtees and Dean Stoneman, to end up in sixth place in the championship standings, a point behind fifth-placed William Buller. He also contested the Estoril round of the Portuguese Formula Renault 2.0 Winter Series, taking second and fifth-place finishes for CR Scuderia.

CR Scuderia, under their new name of CRS Racing, signed Williamson for the 2009 season as part of a four-car team alongside Harry Tincknell, Matias Laine and Joshua Scott. Williamson's Winter Series campaign ruled him ineligible for the Graduates Cup for drivers aged nineteen or under. During the season, Williamson finished 17 of the 20 races, taking a third place at Donington Park and a second place at Brands Hatch en route to a tenth place championship finish.

Williamson moved to defending champions Manor Competition for the 2010 season, again as part of a four-car team with Will Stevens, Thomas Hylkema and Josh Mulholland, with Ollie Millroy replacing Mulholland during the season. In the first round of the season at Thruxton, Williamson claimed the first pole position, and thus became the first driver to take pole in the Barazi-Epsilon-designed car introduced for the 2010 season. Several races later at Brands Hatch, Williamson threw away a chance at his first victory, spinning out of the lead and eventually finishing seventh. The first victory came a month later at Oulton Park, overtaking Tom Blomqvist at the start of the first race and was never headed.

Williamson took further wins at Croft and Silverstone – a rescheduled race from Brands Hatch which Williamson had qualified on pole for – as he and Blomqvist commenced their battle for the championship along with Tamás Pál Kiss and Will Stevens. Williamson trailed Pál Kiss by 27 points and Blomqvist by 15 before the World Series by Renault meeting at Silverstone. Williamson won both races from pole position, to trail Blomqvist by one point on dropped scores heading into the final round at Brands Hatch. In the first race, Williamson finished second, ahead of Blomqvist in third, but Blomqvist claimed fastest lap to draw level with Williamson before the final race. In the final race, Blomqvist made a better start and with team-mate Alex Lynn acting as rear gunner, Blomqvist won the championship with his second place. Despite this, Williamson was nominated for the McLaren Autosport BRDC Award due to his performances in the series. On 5 December 2010, after the evaluation tests held at Silverstone, Williamson was named as the winner of the award, taking the £100,000 cash prize and a Formula One test with McLaren.

GP3 Series
After the end of his Formula Renault campaign, Williamson took part in the post-season GP3 Series test in Estoril, Portugal. Driving for Atech CRS GP, Williamson set the fastest time in the afternoon session on the second and third days, having arrived at the circuit the day before after a chance conversation with team boss David Hayle. Williamson was eventually signed by MW Arden to graduate into GP3 in February 2011.

Formula Renault 3.5 Series

Personal life 
Despite his recent success in formulae cars, Williamson combines his racing with an apprenticeship at Ross-Shire Engineering, working as a fabrication engineer in Muir of Ord, a 100-mile round trip from his home in Golspie.

Racing record

Career summary

* Season still in progress.

Complete GP3 Series results
(key) (Races in bold indicate pole position) (Races in italics indicate fastest lap)

Complete Formula Renault 3.5 Series results
(key) (Races in bold indicate pole position) (Races in italics indicate fastest lap)

Complete FIA World Endurance Championship results

Complete Blancpain GT Series Sprint Cup results

Complete British GT Championship results
(key) (Races in bold indicate pole position) (Races in italics indicate fastest lap)

References

External links
 Official website
 Career statistics from Driver Database
 British Racing Drivers' Club profile

1989 births
Living people
Sportspeople from Dundee
Scottish racing drivers
British Formula Renault 2.0 drivers
Portuguese Formula Renault 2.0 drivers
World Series Formula V8 3.5 drivers
GP3 Series drivers
People educated at Golspie High School
FIA Institute Young Driver Excellence Academy drivers
Manor Motorsport drivers
Arden International drivers
Blancpain Endurance Series drivers
British GT Championship drivers
CRS Racing drivers
ISR Racing drivers
Status Grand Prix drivers
Strakka Racing drivers
Mercedes-AMG Motorsport drivers
McLaren Racing drivers
Craft-Bamboo Racing drivers